Jeffrey Hugh Whalley (8 February 1952 – 23 February 2018) was an English professional footballer who played in the Football League as a left winger.

References

1952 births
2018 deaths
English footballers
Association football midfielders
Blackburn Rovers F.C. players
English Football League players